Epidendrum latilabre is a species of orchid of the genus Epidendrum which occurs naturally in French Guiana, Peru and Brazil. The diploid chromosome number of E. latilabre has been determined as 2n = 40.

References 

latilabre
Orchids of Brazil
Orchids of French Guiana
Orchids of Peru